The Christian University of Indonesia  (UKI, or Universitas Kristen Indonesia) is a private university located in Jakarta, Indonesia.  It was established on October 15, 1953 with its main campus – Campus A – located in Central Jakarta. Campus B is in Cawang, East Jakarta.

The university comprises two tertiary levels of education, undergraduate and postgraduate.

History

Founding and early history
Shortly after the independence of Indonesia on August 17, 1945, national figures who were also prominent leaders in the Indonesian Christian community were compelled to establish The Church Council of Indonesia (DGI: Dewan Gereja Indonesia). 

DGI formed a commission to assess the importance of establishing a university, led by Prof. Dr. I.P. Simandjuntak. As the result, DGI issued a resolution of Universiteit Kristen (a Christian-based-faith university) on June 30, 1953. The resolution, signed by Ds. W.J. Rumambi as the Secretary General of DGI in general session from June 20 to 30 of 1953, asked all churches and Christian people in Indonesia to help the completion of Universiteit Kristen morally or financially.

Indonesian Christian prominent leaders such as Mr. Todung Sutan Gunung Mulia, Mr. Yap Thiam Hien, and Benjamin Thomas Philip Sigar, on behalf of the churches incorporated in DGI, established a Christian university of Indonesia (Yayasan Universitas Kristen Indonesia ) on July 18, 1953. Its membership was expanded with the support of Elviannus Katoppo, Ong Jan Hong, Aminudin Pohan, Seri Condar Nainggolan, Benjamin Prawirohadmodjo, Rev. Komarlin Tjakraatmadja, Gerrit Siwabessy, Tan Tek Heng, and J.C.T. Simorangkir. Three months later, on October 15, 1953, Universitas Kristen Indonesia was officially established with the faculties of Language and Philosophy, and Economics. During those first days, campus life and administration were held at HSK on Jalan Diponegoro 86 and at three apartments on Jalan Salemba 10.

The Faculty of Law was created in 1956, Medicine in 1962, Engineering in 1963, and Social and Political Science in 1994.

Campuses
There are two campuses:

Postgraduate Campus
Located on Jalan Diponegoro, Central Jakarta

Graduate & Undergraduate Campus
Located on Jalan Mayjen Sutoyo No. 2, Cawang, East Jakarta.

Organization

University
Dr. Dhaniswara K.Harjono, SH., MH., MBA is the rector of The Christian University of Indonesia.

Schools and colleges
UKI is organized into schools and colleges, each with a different dean and organization:

Faculties
 Faculty of Law
 Faculty of Social and Political Science
 Faculty of Economics
 Faculty of Education
 Faculty of Engineering
 Faculty of Letters
 Faculty of Medicine
Faculty of Vocational Studies

Post-Graduate schools
 Master Program for Education
 Master Program for Law
 Master Program for Christian Religious Education 
 Master Program for Management
 Master Program for Electrical Engineering
Master Program for Architecture
 Doctoral Program for Law 
 Doctoral Program for Christian Religious Education

References

External links
 Universitas Kristen Indonesia
 Ranking

Educational institutions established in 1953
Universities in Indonesia
Universities in Jakarta
1953 establishments in Indonesia
Private universities and colleges in Jakarta
Association of Christian Universities and Colleges in Asia